Arrowina is a genus of wrinkled bark beetles in the family Carabidae. The genus occurs in Asia, with records from at least Sri Lanka, southern India, Nepal, Thailand, Sumatra (Indonesia), and Japan.

Species
Arrowina contains the following species:

 Arrowina anguliceps (Arrow, 1901)
 Arrowina nan R.T. Bell & J.R. Bell, 2009
 Arrowina nilgiriensis (Arrow, 1942)
 Arrowina punctatolineata (Grouvelle, 1903)
 Arrowina pygmaea R.T. Bell & J.R.Bell, 1979
 Arrowina rostrata (Lewis, 1888)
 Arrowina taksar R.T. Bell & J.R. Bell, 2009
 Arrowina taprobanae (Fairmaire, 1873)

References

Rhysodinae
Carabidae genera
Beetles of Asia